ISO 3166-2:LC is the entry for Saint Lucia in ISO 3166-2, part of the ISO 3166 standard published by the International Organization for Standardization (ISO), which defines codes for the names of the principal subdivisions (e.g., provinces or states) of all countries coded in ISO 3166-1.

Currently for Saint Lucia, ISO 3166-2 codes are defined for 10 districts.

Each code consists of two parts, separated by a hyphen. The second part is two digits (01–12) except 04 and 09.

Current codes
Subdivision names are listed as in the ISO 3166-2 standard published by the ISO 3166 Maintenance Agency (ISO 3166/MA).

Click on the button in the header to sort each column.

Changes
The following changes to the entry have been announced in newsletters by the ISO 3166/MA since the first publication of ISO 3166-2 in 1998. ISO stopped issuing newsletters in 2013.

The following changes to the entry are listed on ISO's online catalogue, the Online Browsing Platform:

See also
 Subdivisions of Saint Lucia
 FIPS region codes of Saint Lucia

References

External links
 ISO Online Browsing Platform: LC
 Districts of Saint Lucia, Statoids.com

2:LC
ISO 3166-2
Saint Lucia geography-related lists